PDM University  is a co-educational private university from the state of Haryana, India. The university has its campus in Bahadurgarh, Delhi NCR. The University has been established by the Haryana State Legislature under the Haryana Private Universities Act No. 32 of 2006, as amended by the Haryana Private Universities (Amendment), Act, 2015 (Haryana Act No.1 of 2016) and notified in the Haryana Govt. Gazette (Extra) Notification No. Leg.2/2016, dated 14 January 2016. The University has also been recognised by UGC under section 2(f) of the UGC Act 1956. The University is established and managed by Prabhu Dayal Memorial Religious & Educational Association (PDMREA).

Campus 
The university campus is in Sector-3A, Sarai Aurangabad, Bahadurgarh located 7 kilometers (4.3 mi) west of the New Delhi-Haryana (Tikri) border.

History 

Prabhu Dayal Memorial Religious & Educational Association (sponsoring body of the university) was established in 1995. The association commonly referred as PDMREA was established in memory of Late Sh. Prabhu Dayal. The group started its education venture with a diploma college in 1996 with PDM Polytechnic. The association later added PDM College of Engineering in 1999. Since then PDMREA has established and supported a number of educational institutions.
 PDM Polytechnic in 1996
 PDM College of Engineering in 1999
 PDM Public School in 2003
 PDM College of Pharmacy in 2004
 PDM Institute of Engineering & Technology at Karsindhu, Safidon (Jind) in 2005
 PDM College of Education in 2006
 PDM Dental College & Research Institute in 2006
 PDM General Hospital in 2006
 PDM College of Diploma Engineering & Technology, Karsindhu, Safidon (Jind) in 2007
 PDM School of Pharmacy, Karsindhu, Safidon (Distt. Jind) in 2008
 PDM College of Engineering for Women in 2009
 PDM College of Technology & Management in 2011
 PDM School of Architecture & Town Planning in 2014
 PDM Primary School in 2015
 PDM University in 2016
Until 2016, all these educational institutions were collectively known as PDM Group of Institutions. After the establishment of PDM University in 2016, these colleges merged into the university as its constituent faculties.

Faculties 
The University has over 120 programs in various discipline of Engineering & Technology, Dental Sciences, Pharmacy, Computer Applications, Physical Sciences, Life Sciences, Agriculture, Commerce and Management Studies.

It includes the following faculties:
 Faculty of Engineering & Technology
 Faculty of Agriculture
 Faculty of Allied Health Sciences
 Faculty of Education
 Faculty of Dental Sciences
 Faculty of Humanities and Social Sciences
 Faculty of Physical Sciences
 Faculty of Law
 Faculty of Life Sciences
 Faculty of Nursing
 Faculty of Commerce & Management Studies
 Faculty of Pharmaceutical  Sciences

Recognition 
All the educational institutes under PDMREA are approved by the UGC, NCTE, DCI, Govt. of India, Govt. of Haryana and CBSE.

In 2013, PDM was declared as the first Microsoft Ed-Vantage Platinum Campus in Haryana by Microsoft.

References

External links 
 

Universities in Haryana
Private universities in India
Educational institutions established in 1995
Educational institutions established in 2016
1995 establishments in Haryana
2016 establishments in Haryana
Education in Jhajjar district